Mike Blumel (born October 22, 1986) is an American speed-skater. His brother Mac also speed-skates. He is from Woodbury, Minnesota.

See also
American speed skaters

References

1986 births
Living people
American male speed skaters
People from Woodbury, Minnesota
21st-century American people